Beat of the Mesozoic is the second EP by the American Avant-rock band Birdsongs of the Mesozoic, released in 1985 by Ace of Hearts Records.

Release and reception

Brian Olewnick of Allmusic gave the album two out of five stars, saying that parts of the record "come across as affected and bland" and sometimes "a bit overwrought." However, he gave good mention to the track "The Beat of the Mesozoic, part I", concluding that at their best the band is "able to generate an infectious power and percussive drive that makes one wish for further explorations along that particular road."

Never being individually issued on Compact Disc, only some of Beat of the Mesozoic had been included on compilations such as Sonic Geology and The Fossil Record. Finally, the entire release was issued by Cuneiform Records on Dawn of the Cycads, a two-disc anthology including most of the band's early work.

Track listing

Personnel
Adapted from the Beat of the Mesozoic liner notes.

Birdsongs of the Mesozoic
 Erik Lindgren – synthesizer, percussion
 Roger Miller – piano, organ, percussion
 Rick Scott – piano, farfisa, synthesizer, percussion 
 Martin Swope – guitar, percussion

Production and additional personnel
 Richard W. Harte – production
 Tony Volante – engineering

Release history

References

External links 
 Beat of the Mesozoic at Discogs (list of releases)

1985 EPs
Birdsongs of the Mesozoic albums